Harriet Bonface (born 26 January 1993) is a Malawian Judoka, she represents Malawi internationally in Judo Tournament in the Extra-lightweight (48 kg) event. She competed at the Zone 6 Youth Games, winning  a bronze medal, as well as the 2019 African Games.

She qualified for the 2020 Summer Olympics.

Her home village is Chikowi, Zomba District.

References

External links
 

Living people
1993 births
Malawian female judoka
Judoka at the 2020 Summer Olympics
African Games competitors for Malawi
Competitors at the 2019 African Games
People from Zomba District
Olympic judoka of Malawi
20th-century Malawian women
21st-century Malawian women